The Nigerian Supreme Council for Islamic Affairs (NSCIA) is the apex Islamic authority in Nigeria. It was established in 1973 to "cater for, preserve, protect, promote and advance the interest of Islam and Muslims throughout the country" and has been responsible for the unity of Nigerian Muslims as the official body, recognised by the Nigerian Federal and State Governments, coordinating the affairs of Islam in Nigeria.  The NSCIA is headquartered at the Abuja National Mosque Office Complex, Central Business District, Abuja, Nigeria. The organisation is, inter alia, responsible for the official announcement of commencement and termination of the Ramadan fast or moon sighting in Nigeria.

History
The Nigeria Supreme Council for Islamic Affairs (NSCIA) was established in 1973 at a national conference of Nigerian Muslim leaders in Kaduna under the auspices of Jama'atu Nasril Islam (JNI), the group for all the Islamic organisations in Northern Nigeria. In the South-West, prior to this conference, the first Muslim organisation to be formed after the 1960 Independence was the United Muslim Council (UMC), but was embraced by a few Muslims in the Western Zone for it was championed by the ruling political party. According to Adegbite, the emergence and coming together of the Western Joint Muslim Organisation (WESJOMO), the Najah Joint Muslim Organisation (NAJOMO) and the Nigerian Muslim Council (NMC) of Lagos State enabled the region to work hand-in-hand with the JNI to create in 1973 the Nigerian Supreme Council for Islamic Affairs.

The landmark convergence in Kaduna came as an answer to the call for an all-embracing central leadership that would serve as the unifier and bridge among different Muslim groups in the country, as stipulated in Article One of the NSCIA Charter “Muslim Communities, Islamic organisations and individual Muslims are hereby constituted into a central body to be known and called the Nigerian Supreme Council of Islamic Affairs.” It has also been described as a turning point for it, starting from then, enables Muslims all over the country to interact with the government in one voice on all matters of concern to Islam, an intractable challenge until the founding of the council.

The council's mandate to serve as the apex leadership body for the Nigerian Muslim community was first undertaken by the first President-General, Sultan Siddiq Abubakar III, the then Sultan of Sokoto, joined by the first Secretary-General, Ibrahim Dasuki, who later rose to assume the Sultan position. The former Nigerian Minister of Works, Isa Kaita, was appointed National Treasurer while Dr Lateef Adegbite, the chairman of the Constitution Drafting Committee and the then the Attorney-General and Commissioner of Justice of the Western Region of Nigeria, was made the first National Legal Adviser. He later became the Secretary-General in 1988.

Leadership 

The leadership of the NSCIA includes the President-General, two Deputies President-General for the North and South (with the Shehu of Borno as the permanent Deputy President-General for the North), Secretary-General, Deputy Secretary-General (3), National Treasurer, National Legal Adviser, Deputy National Legal Adviser and Chairmen of the 36 states and FCT Councils of the NSCIA. Currently, the council is under the leadership of the incumbent Sultan of Sokoto, His Eminence Muhammad Sa’ad Abubakar since 2006 with Prof.Is-haq O. Oloyede, former Vice Chancellor of the University of Ilorin and current Registrar and Chief Executive of Nigeria's Joint Admissions and Matriculation Board (JAMB), as the Secretary-General since May 2013. The Shehu of Borno Abubakar Ibn Umar Garba serves as the Deputy President General North, while Rasaki Oladejo serves as the Deputy President General South of the council.

Objectives
The Nigeria Supreme Council for Islamic Affairs (NSCIA) serves the following functions:

Structure 

The Nigeria Supreme Council for Islamic Affairs system is based on five active organs: Legislative organ, the General Assembly, Executive organ, National Executive Council and the National Secretariat.

Legislative Organ 
The General Assembly is the supreme legislative organ of the council, and subject to the provisions of the Constitution, the General Assembly sitting in plenary session exercises final authority in all matters dealt with in the Constitution guiding the affairs of the council or affecting Islam and the Muslims in Nigeria generally.

General Assembly 
The membership of the General Assembly is stipulated in Article 6 of the NSCIA Constitution. The General Assembly consists of the President-General of the Council, National Officers of the council, and State Council Representatives selected by their respective State Councils in accordance with the provision of paragraph (2) of the Article. Such individuals are co-opted from time to time by the General Assembly itself for a stated period and on the basis of the status or individual contributions of such persons to the cause of Islam.

Executive Organ 
The NSCIA has a National Executive Council which is the executive organ to whom all Officers and Committees established by the council are primarily accountable in the discharge of their functions and in the exercise of their powers.

National Executive Council 
The National Executive Council comprises the following:

 National Officers of the Council
 One member representing each State Council
 Co-opted members from the General Assembly not exceeding one-tenth of the total membership of the National Executive Council.

National Secretariat 
The NSCIA's National Secretariat, headquartered in Abuja, is headed by the Secretary-General. It provides information, monthly moon-sighting reports, studies, and facilities needed by other organs for their effective operations. It also executes tasks as instructed by the Legislative Organ, the Sultan – the President-General – and other Council's bodies. The council also employs the services of a full-time Administrative Director-General who is hired on terms and conditions as the National Executive Council deems fit. The Director-General handles the day-to-day affairs of the Secretariat, coordinate the activities of the Zonal Directors and is responsible to the NEC through the Secretary-General.

NSCIA and the quest for a multi-religious Nigeria 
In 1975 when the Federal Government of Nigeria inaugurated the Constitution Drafting Committee, there was a hot debate on a proposed section of the constitution on the state and its fundamental objectives. Kicking against the suggestion that Nigeria be described as “One and indivisible sovereign Republic, secular, democratic and social,” intellectuals and public opinion leaders began to debate the appropriateness or otherwise of the term “secular” for the Nigerian state. According to several sources, the NSCIA, standing on the argument that Nigeria is a multi-religious state, maintained that the country could not be a secular state in that the concept of secularism is ultimately rooted in the doctrine that morality should be based solely on regard to well-being of mankind with absolute exclusion of all considerations drawn from belief in God. This is no way the true case of Nigeria, according to NSCIA's argument that the country—although not a theocratic state such as the likes of Saudi-Arabia nor a secular state like Turkey—is a multi-religious state by default. Not only does Nigeria recognises religions, the "Nigerian government also facilitates pilgrimages (to the holy lands), provides for the teaching of religious studies in schools, and declares public holidays for religious festivals." The Council added that “Nigerians have a work-free day on Sunday because Christians are required to worship on that day owing to the insistence of their religion that the day be work-free and that the government also recognises the Vatican and allows them to have an ambassador in Nigeria and in response, sent an ambassador to the state of Vatican.” Relying on the foregoing arguments, the Council submitted, and triumphed, that it would be hypocritical to say that Nigeria is a secular state.

Contributions and achievements 
The Nigerian Supreme Council for Islamic Affairs (NSCIA) takes charge of some responsibilities in Nigeria from Islamic Affairs to promoting education and contributing to participatory governance and national development. Some of the contributions and achievements include:

Religious tolerance and peaceful co-existence 
Despite the challenges of sectoral divisions, the NSCIA has become a leading voice for religious tolerance in Nigeria through active steps on improving peace and peaceful-coexistence in the country. Of recent, the President-General of the Council and the Sultan of Sokoto, Alhaji Muhammad Sa’d Abubakar, has been at the forefront of this campaign through several initiatives and appearances at local and high-level international panels such as the Wilson Centre, diplomatic organisations and the Sultan Foundation for Peace and Development (SFPD) among others. In terms of results, the NSCIA, for instance, prevailed over Muslims, especially those in the North, who were agitated with the burning of mosques in the South East and South South regions following the hijacking of the #EndSARS protests in Nigeria. That particular action quelled religious violence in the country.

Officials of the NSCIA have also participated at the Vienna Conference on Global Peace, Inter-Faith Dialogue on Religion and Peace-Making and several other peace-building platforms. Besides, one notable initiative in the regard of peaceful co-existence is the Nigeria Inter-Religious Council (NIREC), a voluntary association jointly established by the leadership of the NSCIA and the Christian Association of Nigeria (CAN) in 1999. Steered by the joint leadership of the major faiths, NIREC has continued to maintain the ties of religious tolerance and peaceful co-existence in the country.

Uniting Muslims 
In Nigeria, the NSCIA is carrying out the Quranic injunction that Muslims the world over must be one and united regardless of their ethnic, racial and socio-linguistic differences. God says in the Quran (3: 103) “And hold fast, all of you together, to the Rope of Allah (i.e. This Qur’an), and be not divided among yourselves, and remember Allah’s Favour on you, for you were enemies one to another but He joined your hearts together, so that, by His Grace, you became brethren (in Islamic Faith). Also in Quran 49:10 is a verse where God says “The believers are nothing else than brothers (in Islamic religion). So make reconciliation between your brothers, and fear Allah, that you may receive mercy.”

Muslim financial inclusion in Nigeria 
Nigerian Muslims are believed to have been marginalised in the country's financial sector and other growth-triggering financial interventions of the Central Bank due largely to the interest element that is usually involved in the schemes. For Muslims, who constitute well over half of the country's population, the question of avoiding interest is non-negotiable. In the absence of non-interest finance, the result has been a high rate of financial exclusion among Muslims, as high as over 60% in some Muslim majority communities. This leads to worsening incidence of abject poverty. The implication is that without non-interest alternatives, the CBN can hardly attain its 80% financial inclusion earlier targeted for 2020 nor can any meaningful poverty alleviation and economic empowerment programme be actualised in the foreseeable future. This explains why the Council engaged the Central Bank on the creation of a non-interest version of all its intervention programmes. As eventually done, the development covers the Anchor Borrowers Programme (ABP), Agri-Business, Small and Medium Enterprises Investment Scheme (AGSMEIS), Creative Industry Financing Initiative, Micro, Small and Medium Enterprise Development Fund (MSMEDF), Real Sector Support Facility (RSSF) and Credit Support for the Healthcare Sector.

Moon sighting 
As the highest Muslim body in Nigeria, the NSCIA takes the responsibility of announcing the commencement and termination of the annual Ramadan fast. Unlike the years past when there is no orderliness in the moon sighting arm, the council has since recorded great results since 2014 as large numbers of Muslims in Nigeria now commence, end the fasting of Ramadan and celebrate the Eid festivals in unison, as the NSCIA Moon-sighting Committee, led by Professor Usman El-Nafaty, gives moon-sighting updates everyday year-round.

Supervision of Hajj operations 
In supporting the National Hajj Commission established by the Federal Government to superintend the annual Hajj operation in the country, the NSCIA has been acting as an intermediary between the intending pilgrims, the National Hajj Commission and the Federal Government. The council offers many advisory aids to the commission, and advises the authority on how to achieve successful pilgrimage to the holy land on a yearly basis.

Mission for Education, Socials and Health 
The NSCIA established a project entity called Mission for Education, Socials and Health (MESH), registered by the Corporate Affairs Commission (CAC) in April 2016 as part of its commitment to social needs of Muslims and poverty alleviation among Nigerians. One of the popular projects of MESH is the partnership with the Future Assured Initiative of the First Lady, Aisha Buhari, in 2020 to organise a national conference on Repositioning the Muslim Family for National Development at the Banquet Hall of the Presidential Villa, Abuja.

References

Islam in Nigeria